Rites of Passage is a 2012 American thriller film written and directed by W. Peter Iliff. The film stars Wes Bentley, Kate Maberly, Ryan Donowho, Christian Slater and Stephen Dorff.

Plot
Nathan (Ryan Donowho), a studious anthropology student, decries his position in a society that fails to provide a ceremony to mark his transition into manhood. Professor Nash (Stephen Dorff), an unethical teacher who openly pursues sexual liaisons with his female students, is intrigued when Nathan tells him his family's unoccupied but functional ranch is the site of an ancient Indian burial ground. Nathan convinces Professor Nash to bring the class out to the ranch, where the plan is to hold a spiritual ceremony in a sweat lodge built over the burial site. Encouraged by Nash's enthusiastic agreement to the idea, Nathan guides his stressed, party-going classmates to the ranch. There they meet his brother, Benny (Wes Bentley), who is in a psychotic spiral of drug addiction and guilt. A crystal meth cook at the ranch, Delgado (Christian Slater), a man with a grudge who has an uneasy friendship with the brother, kills two of the students after he and the brother are insulted. Delgado then begins hunting the rest of the group. During his rampage, Delgado hallucinates that a stuffed monkey named Pancho that clings to his shotgun talks and makes futile attempts to reason with his apparently absent sense of morality.

Cast
Wes Bentley as Benny
Kate Maberly as Dani
Ryan Donowho as Nathan
Christian Slater as Delgado
Stephen Dorff as Professor Nash
Briana Evigan as Penelope
Travis Van Winkle as Hart
Carly Schroeder as Carly
Ashley Hinshaw as Sandee
Guy Burnet as Mojo

Release
The film was released straight-to-DVD on October 16, 2012. The trailer for the film was released on late 2011, and can be viewed on the official Rites of Passage website, Facebook page, and YouTube.

The film premiered at the Isla Vista Theatre in Isla Vista, Calif. The audience responded enthusiastically, except for about a half dozen Native American activists who appeared at the showing to protest. During the subsequent Q&A, the activists accused the film of being racist, exploitative, a mockery of Chumash rituals, and "cultural prostitution." However, actor Mylo IronBear, a Native American spirit warrior of the Spirit Lake Tribe, who appears as a Chumash in the film, disagreed with the activists. "I am standing behind this film because it’s a film,” IronBear said, adding that Iliff was entitled to his artistic interpretation.

A member of the Chumash tribe stood up after the activists were removed by police and apologized for their behavior, indicating that they did not represent the Chumash Nation. The Chumash jimsonweed ceremony portrayed in the film was accurately represented according to anthropologist J.P. Harrington's extensive field notes from Chumash informants in the early 1900s.

References

External links
 
 

2012 films
American independent films
American thriller films
2012 thriller films
Voltage Pictures films
Films scored by Elia Cmíral
2012 independent films
2010s English-language films
2010s American films